Consuelo Tomás Fitzgerald (born 1957 in Bocas del Toro) is a Panamanian actress in puppet shows, playwright, poet, novelist and radio and television co-ordinator.

She is a producer and editor-in-chief of the radio station Crisol FM and the Panamanian Radio and Television State Broadcasting (Sistema Estatal de Radio y Televisión, SERTV). She is also a member of the Cultural Association AlterArte and the Executive Committee in Projects for Drama Training in Central America (Carromato).

Works 
Confieso estas Ternuras y estas rabias (Poetry, Formato 16, 1983)
Las preguntas indeseables (Poetry, Ed. Formato 16, 1985)
Cuentos Rotos (Short Stories, Ed. Mariano Arosemena, 1991)
Motivos Generales (Poetry, Ed. Buho, República Dominicana, 1992)
Apelaciones (Poetry, Col. Antologías y Homenajes, Ed. Mariano Arosemena, 1993)
El Cuarto Edén (Poetry, Epic Publications, 1985)
Inauguración de la Fe (Novel, Col. Premio, Ed. Mariano Arosemena, 1995)
Agonía de la Reina (Poetry, Col. Premio, Ed. Mariano Arosemena, 1995)
Libro de las Propensiones (Poetry, 2000)
Evangelio según San Borges (Theatre, Ed. Mariano Arosemena, 2005)
Pa'na'má Quererte (Short Stories, 2007)
Lágrima de dragón (Novel, 2010)

Prizes
 First Working Literature Competition Award, 1979
 Literature Award «Ricardo Miró», 1994

References

External links
 Personal Information

1957 births
Living people
People from Bocas del Toro Province
Panamanian actresses
Panamanian women writers
20th-century Panamanian women writers
20th-century Panamanian writers
21st-century Panamanian women writers
21st-century Panamanian writers